J road may refer to :
 roads in Johor in the Malaysian State Roads system
 Corridor J, a highway in the U.S. states of Tennessee and Kentucky

See also
 J Street (disambiguation)